The 2009–10 3. Liga season was the second season for the newly formed tier III of the German football league system. The season began on 25 July 2009 and ended on 8 May 2010.

Team changes from 2008–09

Exchange between 2. Bundesliga and 3. Liga
2008–09 3. Liga champions 1. FC Union Berlin and runners-up Fortuna Düsseldorf were directly promoted to the 2. Bundesliga. They were replaced by FC Ingolstadt 04 and SV Wehen Wiesbaden, who finished in the bottom two places after the previous season.

Third-placed team SC Paderborn 07 were also promoted after defeating the 16th-placed team from last year's 2nd Bundesliga, VfL Osnabrück, in a relegation playoff. As a result, Osnabrück would play in 3. Liga.

Exchange between 3. Liga and Regionalliga
VfR Aalen and Stuttgarter Kickers were relegated after finishing the 2008–09 season in the bottom two places. 18th-placed SV Wacker Burghausen were eventually spared from relegation after 5th-placed Kickers Emden voluntarily retracted their application for a license because of financial issues. Emden will play in the fifth-tier Oberliga Niedersachsen.

The three relegated teams were replaced by the champions of the three Regionalliga divisions, Holstein Kiel (North), Borussia Dortmund II (West) and 1. FC Heidenheim 1846 (South).

Team overview

Stadia and locations

Managerial changes

League table

Results

Top goalscorers
Source: Kicker magazine 

22 goals
  Régis Dorn (SV Sandhausen)

21 goals
  Moritz Hartmann (FC Ingolstadt 04)

17 goals
  Orlando (FC Carl Zeiss Jena)

15 goals
  Dennis Kruppke (Eintracht Braunschweig)
  Andreas Spann (1. FC Heidenheim)

14 goals
  Michael Holt (Holstein Kiel)
  Sven Schipplock (VfB Stuttgart II)
  Tobias Schweinsteiger (SpVgg Unterhaching)

13 goals
  Carsten Kammlott (FC Rot-Weiß Erfurt)
  Deniz Yılmaz (FC Bayern Munich II)

Player of the month

 August:  Björn Lindemann (VfL Osnabrück)
 September:  Roberto Pinto (SV Sandhausen)
 October:  Tobias Schweinsteiger (SpVgg Unterhaching)
 November:  Björn Lindemann (VfL Osnabrück)
 December:  Najeh Braham (Erzgebirge Aue)
 February:  Tore Andreas Gundersen (Dynamo Dresden)
 March:  Andreas Spann (1. FC Heidenheim)
 April:  Björn Lindemann (VfL Osnabrück)

Björn Lindemann was named as player of the season

References

External links
 3rd Liga at the official German FA website 

3. Liga seasons
3
German